SMCC may refer to:

Organisations
 Saint Mary's College of California
 Santa Monica College
 Science Media Centre of Canada
 Sierra Madre Congregational Church
 Southern Maine Community College
 Southwest Mississippi Community College
 South Mountain Community College
 St Mary's Cathedral College, Sydney
 St. Mary's Canossian College
 Syro Malabar Catholic Congress
 Syro-Malabar Catholic Church
 Syro-Malankara Catholic Church

Science and technology
 Social Media in a Corporate Context
 Submarine Command Course
 Sun Microsystems Computer Company
 Succinimidyl 4-(N-maleimidomethyl)cyclohexane-1-carboxylate - heterobifunctional chemical linker